The 1986 Minnesota gubernatorial election took place on November 4, 1986. Minnesota Democratic–Farmer–Labor Party candidate Rudy Perpich defeated Independent-Republican Party challenger Cal Ludeman. George Latimer unsuccessfully ran for the Democratic nomination.

Results

1986 is also the year that the Twin Cities WCCO sportcaster Mark Rosen had a write-in campaign for governor as a morning radio program's publicity stunt.

References

Gubernatorial
1986
Minnesota